Ronald Rupert Peplow (4 May 1935 – 15 March 2019) was an English professional footballer who played in the Football League for Brentford as a wing half. He also played non-League football for Southall, Folkestone Town and Ashford Town. Peplow was a penalty specialist and scored 28 goals from 30 attempts during his career.

Club career

Brentford 
Peplow began his career as an inside forward at Athenian League club Southall and caught the attention of Third Division South neighbours Brentford during the 1954–55 season. He signed for the Bees in August 1955 and made his professional debut almost a year later in a 1–0 win over Swindon Town on 21 April 1956. Utilised mainly as a wing half, Peplow made something of a breakthrough into the first team during the 1956–57 season and made 17 appearances. He was transfer-listed as his own request in September 1958, but a move did not materialise and his appearance rate reduced season-by-season until 1960–61, when he made 18 appearances and scored three goals. He was released in June 1961, having made 66 appearances and scored five goals in six years at Griffin Park.

Non-League football 
After his release from Brentford, Peplow dropped back into non-League football and had spells with Southern League clubs Folkestone Town and Ashford Town.

Representative career 
While a schoolboy, Peplow represented the Middlesex and London schoolboy teams.

Career statistics

Honours 
Ashford Town

 Kent Senior Cup: 1962–63 (drawn)
 Kent Floodlight Cup: 1962–63

References

1935 births
Footballers from Willesden
English footballers
Brentford F.C. players
English Football League players
Southall F.C. players
Folkestone F.C. players
Southern Football League players
Association football wing halves
Association football inside forwards
Ashford United F.C. players
2019 deaths